Baniyatol   is a village in Kohabara VDC, Jhapa District in the Mechi Zone of south-eastern Nepal. It is one of the most developed village in Kohabara VDC. As estimated in 2011, it had a population of approx. 100 people living in their own house.

Population

The total estimated population of this village is approximately 100 in 2011 AD. People living here are mostly Brahmin and Chhetri. Nepali is used as a lingua franca in this village and Rajbanshi and other regional languages are spoken by people here. Hinduism is practiced by almost all people here and the number of people following Christianity is increasing among some Madhesi community.

Infrastructures

Roadway is only means of transportation in this village and road is gravelled here. Only one bus regularly travels here by making this village a final station.
Health services like hospitals and health posts are not available at all. People have to depend upon nearby VDC for medical treatment.
Only one government school is available in the village.
Wireless communication is available in whole village. However, cable is not available here.
Electricity is available here which was joined several years ago
A small hotel for selling of snacks, alcoholic drinks and some food items is available which is licensed and owned by local resident Mr. Man Bahadur Raut which was established a few years ago.

Religious view

The village has been a major attraction for many pilgrims from far VDCs. A large Hindu temple has been constructed here offering facilities for religious ceremonies like Puran, marriage, Bratabandha and others. Every year, Puran is organized by locals in this village also.

References

Populated places in Jhapa District